Ananda Wedisinghe (1970 – 29 May 2017) was a Sri Lankan motor racing legend and eight time Fox Hill Supercross motorcycle national champion of Sri Lanka. He hailed from Kurunegala and is credited as the pioneer of Sri Lankan motorcross racing. He died at age 47 due to injuries sustained to his head and leg following a motor cycle crash during a Nuwara Eliya road race held on 23 April 2017.

Legacy 
Wedisinghe was credited with introducing motor supercross sport in Sri Lanka and was an ardent promoter of the sport.

Early life
He was born in 1970 at small village in Kurunegala, Sri Lanka. He has a twin brother (who died after birth) and two young brothers (also  racers of Car and Moto) and a young sister. As a child, he grew up watching his father racing and he dreamed himself to be the best rider when he grew up. He studied at St. Anne's College, Kurunegala.

Career
With his career as a motorcross rider he was the founder of " Auto plaza Ananda international (PVT) Ltd" at the age of 20 which continues till now.

Family
His father was Siri Wedisinghe one of the first motorcycle racers from Sri Lanka who also died from a racing accident. Wedisinghe went to Japan in 1988 after his loss with the help of fellow countryman, Dilantha Malagamuwa, and was able to establish himself as a motorcycle rider. Wedisinghe married his Japanese wife, Rumi, returning to Sri Lanka where he started promoting motorcross sport. They have four children, Risa Wedisinghe (b.1991), Kenryuji Wedisinghe (b.1993), Rina Wedisinghe (b.1996) and Jun Wedisinghe (b.1999).

Death 
Wedisinghe was in a coma following the accident and was being treated for serious injuries at the intensive care unit of the Kandy general hospital for five weeks until his death on 29 May 2017. His funeral took place at the Malkaduwawela cemetery in Kurunegala. He was survived by four children.

See also
List of Sri Lankan sportspeople

References

1970 births
2017 deaths
Sri Lankan sportspeople
Sinhalese sportspeople
Sri Lankan motorcycle racers